Pınarlı can refer to:

 Pınarlı, Baskil
 Pınarlı, Bozdoğan
 Pınarlı, Çayırlı
 Pınarlı, Çermik
 Pınarlı, Dinar
 Pınarlı, Hopa
 Pınarlı, Horasan
 Pınarlı, İspir
 Pınarlı, Şavşat
 the Turkish name for Vitsada